I am from Xinjiang on the Silk Road is a documentary telling the story of 18 Xinjiang people in contemporary China. The film seeks to record the perspective of people with real experiences in order to present the status and dreams of those from Xinjiang. The documentary shows how people from Xinjiang integrate themselves into a society with different nationalities and cultures, attempts to dispel preconceptions of Xinjiang, and shows ordinary people's everyday lives.

The six-episode large-scale documentary was produced by Shanghai Jianghan Culture Investment Development Co., Ltd., and was jointly produced by the People's Political Consultative Conference Culture Media Co., Ltd., Suizhong Holdings, and the Beijing Dianyi Culture Communication Center. Director Chen Xiaoqing of "A Bite of China" served as advisor, director and actor Chen Jianbin as artistic director, actress Tong Liya, initiator of the Yanran Fund Li Yapeng as the co-producer. The former author Kurbanjan Semat as the general director and chief producer. A book has been published about the experiences of Xinjiang people based on the series. It records the experiences of the photographer Kurbanjan Samat and 100 of his Xinjiang subjects who work and live in Mainland China on which "I am from Xinjiang on the Silk Road" is based.

Background 
The documentary series was  planned and directed by an Uygur Kurbanjan Samat (قۇربانجان سەمەت). The original story of more than 100 ordinary Xinjiang people working and living in different ages, ethnic groups, occupations, and was recorded in shots and words by Kurbanjan. These images show that contemporary Xinjiang people who try to achieve their dreams. Xinjiang is located in the most western part of China that accounts for one-sixth of China’s territory with distinct geographical and cultural features. It has 20 million people of different nations who live in their own cultural traditions. However, for many Chinese and other people, Xinjiang is still a mysterious and unfamiliar topic. The media coverage of Xinjiang is mostly about the deserts, the poverty in the region, its fruit produce, and the song and dance of the people there. As a result, people know very little about Xinjiang, and the terrorist incidences that have occurred in recent years created a negative impression for Xinjiang.

The documentary director saw the confusion of his compatriots and used his camera to record the lives of the people of Xinjiang to present them to the rest of the country in the documentary. The series shows Xinjiang and the lives its people as it existed, and presents the region from the perspective of Xinjiang people. The documentary demonstrates that Xinjiang is an inalienable part of these people, and that Xinjiang gives them a distinct personality and unique experiences, but also presents them with extraordinary choices. Even when they leave Xinjiang, they are still inextricably linked to Xinjiang. Therefore, he named the title is "I come from Xinjiang on the silk road."

Episodes 
The process of life is an eternal theme. From the founding of the country to the reform and development till now, there are many people from Xinjiang, like other people from different provinces and cities, who fight hard and look for their dreams and opportunities in the past 30 years.

In the story of the documentary "I come from Xinjiang on the silk road", Xinjiang serves as the background to the daily experience of the people. The documentary seeks to convey the fascination and charm that is the spirit of Xinjiang. Each character may illustrate a typical issue they faced in contemporary society. In the six episodes, there are dreams, struggles, hometowns, affection, love, and marriage. They left their hometowns to work and live in large and medium-sized cities such as Beijing, Shanghai, and Guangzhou. They created their own lives through social development and their own knowledge and ability.

They gain a certain degree of success through their personal efforts and struggle. Everyone in "I come from Xinjiang" is trying hard to integrate with this society and time, and with different nationalities and cultures, it conveys our respect for the ordinary people who struggled.

Season 1 I Am From Xinjiang On The Silk Road 
The series include six episodes and each episode concludes three stories of people.

Dream 
The episode is about challenging yourself and challenging the limits. The three characters are all dedicated to pursuing their dreams and career.

Abrati, the founder of the Guangzhou Flying club, used to be a dancer but decided to pursue his dream learn to be a paragliding coach. Zu Lipikar, began playing boxing at the age of 3 and through his efforts to enter international competitions. He could challenge the gold belt and get closer to achieving the dream of becoming a professional boxer. Yaya, a Han girl was born and grown up in Xinjiang. She fell in love with nature and becomes involved with the protection of wildlife and environment.

Family 
This episode is about family, the story between two generations.

The Xinjiang couple who took the scientific research road in Tsinghua University, despite all kinds of pressures and difficulties in life, they still chose to bring their daughter from Xinjiang to Beijing, to accompany her growing up. Otkai, a high school student born in Shanghai who is a second-generation of Xinjiang people. He hoped to use his own efforts to win the basketball championship for the class, even with injury. Eric, the first visit to Beijing because he wanted to see Mao, and later he lived in Beijing for 30 years. Due to his son had brain cancer, he tried his best to look after his son. Despite the pain and hardship of life, he always shows a smile.

Career 
This episode shows three business people and their career and pursuit. Their way of doing business has a distinctive brand from Xinjiang.

Yang Jian left from Xinjiang for love, he came to Shanghai, running a restaurant from three people's to more than 1200 stuff. How to make the employees of 17 nationalities and 7 different nationalities get along harmoniously, he made a bold attempt in culture and also made a fusion of the tastes of foods. Kahal is an English teacher and an entrepreneur, he started from zero and hoped to open 100 foreign language education institutions in China. Zhang Zhiqiang represents a strong adaptability. In Shenzhen, he fully integrated into the local lifestyle. In his body, there are the characteristics of merchants on the Millennium Silk Road.

Love 
This episode is focused on three young women and is about love. They talk about emotional issues in the era of great changes.

Xie Yaer, who had no time to talk about marriage and had high expectations for marriage, decided to complete a declaration by taking a picture of one person's wedding.

Go back home 
This episode tells the story of going home, and represents different states of life.

Ali Mujiang, returning to Ürümqi, waiting for him is a smooth sailing life. All resources are in the place where they grew up. Ruxian Guli, a dancer who drifts in Beijing, dreams of returning home to take care of her aging parents. However, as her father’s illness died, she returned home and found out that her family had become a place she couldn’t go back to. Ma Jun, returned to the remote town in the west. He discovered that from emotions to lifestyles, he is already having a hard time in his homeland. Hometown, what does it mean to him?

Start on a journey 
The key words in this episode are start on a journey.

Li Yapeng, young and famous actor, has now faded out of the entertainment industry. When he saw where he grew up, he could not help crying. This is also the core of the entire story. What kind of deep imprint has left him in Xinjiang? Parhati, a real Xinjiang native musician, use life experiences to communicate with Xinjiang and transfer that to songs. Tong liya, Xinjiang is the start point of her dancing and her whole life.

Season 2 I Am Going To Xinjiang  
The documentary “I am going to Xinjiang” was produced by the Shanghai Jianghange Culture Company and is divided into exploration, pioneering, homecoming, reunion, inspiration, challenges, and opportunities. It tells the story of ordinary people in China and also presents a story within the "One Belt One Road" magnificent style along the route.

Kurbanjan Semat, who served as general director and chief producer, said that the shooting style is similar to  “I am from Xinjiang on the Silk Road” and the crew focused on the people supporting all aspects of Xinjiang construction in different periods of New China. "We spoke from the daily lives of little people and focused on the moving stories of generations of people who went to Xinjiang and took root in Xinjiang. At the same time, we also excavated the unique local customs and people's interest in work and life."

"I am going to Xinjiang " will hold a documentary premiere at the Great Hall of the People in March 2018 and will officially air on the CCTV-9, online media such as Tencent and iQiyi.

Season 3 I Was Born In Xinjiang  
The third season of the documentary film "I Was Born in Xinjiang" was also planned to start in 2018.

Awards 
On Nov 11, 2016, the large-scale documentary "I am from Xinjiang on the Silk Road" won the 22nd China Television Documentary Award for Best Micro-Recording Works.

On June 12, 2017, "I am from Xinjiang on the Silk Road" won the 2016 Outstanding Domestic Documentary.

Media Review 
"When reading news, Xinjiang is sometimes very distant; when reading this book, Xinjiang is very familiar! In these pictures and texts, there is no one else but ourselves. It is unclear what these stories will change, but these stories appear before us and themselves are changes!"                               —— Bai Yansong

"Kurbanjan is my colleague and we work together for many years. As a photographer with outstanding talent, Kurbanjan is keen, diligent, and kind. As a Uighur youth, he has always had his own unique and profound understanding of the changes that have taken place in Xinjiang these years. This "I come from Xinjiang" is his expression after a long period of precipitation. It is a true documentary."                                                                               ——Chen Xiaoqing (General Director of A Bite of China)

"I Am From Xinjiang On The Silk Road" This book records 100 stories with heart and photos, recording love and peace."                  ——Jackie Chan

References 

Chinese documentary television series
2010s documentary television series